The Flight Research Laboratory (building 1244) at NASA's Langley Research Center houses fixed and rotary wing aircraft used in atmospheric and flight research.  It also housed simulation equipment used during the Gemini and Apollo programs such as the Rendezvous Docking Simulator (which remains stowed in the ceiling of the hangar) and Projector Planetarium.

At the time of its construction it was one of the largest structures of its kind in the world. The hangar is heated by a radiant heating system consisting of hot water circulated beneath the concrete floor.

See also
 Rendezvous Docking Simulator
 Projection Planetarium

References

Langley Research Center
Space technology research institutes
Aerospace research institutes
Aviation research institutes